is a magical girl manga series created by Megumi Mizusawa that was serialized in Ribon Magazine from August 1990 to January 1994. It was later developed into a 61 episode anime series, produced by Studio Gallop, that aired from October 2, 1992 to December 3, 1993. Hajime Watanabe's first project as a character designer was with Hime-chan no Ribbon. The manga series was collected into ten volumes in Japan, where it received a full anime DVD release. A stage musical of the show was produced in December 1993 starring the idol group SMAP. The musical was presented in three episodes, each a week apart. SMAP performed the opening theme and the three ending themes for the anime and each member appears in animated form in episode 13. Both manga and anime are currently unlicensed in the United States.

Plot
The story is about Himeko Nonohara (野々原姫子 Nonohara Himeko), also known as Hime-chan (姫ちゃん, using the Chinese character for "princess"), an aloof, childlike, yet boasty thirteen-year-old girl who frets over the fact that she is the biggest tomboy in the school. Himeko would like nothing more than to be a proper, feminine young lady, like her older sister Aiko, so that she could approach her secret crush, Hasekura.

One night, Himeko is unexpectedly approached by a girl, who is a near-mirror image of herself, floating outside of her bedroom window. She discovers that the girl is Princess Erika of the Magical Kingdom. Erika explains that people in the Magical Kingdom have an exact counterpart in the Human World and that, in order to prove herself worthy as a princess, she must give Himeko a magical item that she has created. Himeko is allowed the use of this item, a red hair ribbon, for one year to determine whether it is useful, and consequently, if Erika will inherit the crown.

The ribbon allows Himeko to transform into anyone in the Human World for one hour. If Himeko is unable to recite the magic incantation in reverse before the hour is up, she will be trapped in that person's form for the rest of her life. She is unable to reveal the secret of the ribbon and the existence of the Magical Kingdom to anyone. If she does, her memory will be erased as punishment. Assisting her with this is her stuffed lion, Pokota, whom the ribbon brought to life. Erika will watch her in the Magic Kingdom through her crystal ball for one year, at which point the ribbon will be returned.

Themes
In authoring Hime-chan's Ribbon, Megumi Mizusawa used themes common to magical girl manga. The concept of being able to transform into other people had been a feature of Himitsu no Akko-chan (1962).

Characters
 

Himeko is the protagonist of the series. She progresses from being a tomboy at the beginning of the series to becoming a refined, feminine and mature girl by the series' end. Erika, her counterpart in the Land of Magic is an elegant princess, but warms to Hime-chan's playfulness which often lands them both in trouble with the King and Queen and Erika's magical broom, Chappy.
Himeko had a childhood crush on the much older Hasekura-senpai, but she gradually falls in love with Daichi instead. The name Himeko means "little princess". Hime-chan's motto is "Ike! Ike! Go! Go! Jump!". (Come on, Come on, go, go, jump)
 

Pokota is Himeko's favorite stuffed animal that is only animate when Himeko is wearing the magic ribbon. He is Himeko's friend and voice of reason, often helping her out of various difficult situations. Daichi was suspicious of Pokota from the first time that he saw him and treated Pokota harshly before he could confirm that Pokota was "alive". Pokota, being a toy has no direct equal in the magic world, but he becomes close friends with a pink cat, Pink-chan.

Daichi is a trouble maker at Himeko's school. By chance they meet at an abandoned house that Himeko was passing by on her way to give Hasekura-senpai a good luck charm. Daichi, who kept to himself prior to meeting Himeko, begins teasing her initially because of her tomboyish behavior. Daichi warms to Hime-chan and they become friends, eventually falling in love with her. He discovers her secret about the ribbon and Pokota. The King and Queen make an exception to the rule of secrecy for Daichi and he often travels with Himeko to the Land of Magic where Camille is his exact counterpart.
 

Hikaru attends the same class as Himeko and Daichi. She shows interest in Daichi and thinks of Hime-chan as her rival. She becomes suspicious of Hime-chan's secretiveness and she comes close to exposing Hime-chan's secret, but always is foiled at the last minute by one of Hime-chan's friends or by Hime-chan herself. Robelia is Hikaru's mirror match from the Land of Magic.

Sei and his bird, Kantaro are from the Land of Magic. Sei is initially only after Himeko's magic, though after his guise of pretending to be a transfer student is revealed, he befriends Daichi and Hime-chan instead. Hime-chan does not forgive his earlier threatening behavior and rejects Sei's attempts at becoming better acquainted.

Hasekura takes the same bus and is in the same grade of Himeko's older sister, Aiko, and is a senior student to Hime-chan. Hime-chan's crush goes unnoticed by Hasekura and he falls in love with her older sister instead.

Aiko is Himeko's sister. (All of the females in the family have names that end with "ko" (子)) Hasekura and Aiko fall in love which saddens Hime-chan. Aiko is treated as a role model by both of her younger sisters, particularly Hime-chan who chooses Aiko as her first ever transformation. She is also incredibly beautiful and domesticated.
 

Yumeko is Aiko and Himeko's younger sister. Her exploits with Daichi's younger brother, Shintaro often cause their older siblings much grief.

Shintaro is Daichi's younger brother. He is friends with Yumeko.
 and 
Voiced by: Katsuyo Endou (Manami) and Minami Takayama (Ichiko)
 Himeko, Manami and Ichiko are best friends. Manami claims ownership of Himeko calling her "My hime-chan". She refers to many things as being "cool" and enjoys cooking. Ichiko is referred to as Ii-chan. She is adept at archery.
 and Hiroshi 
Voiced by: Chika Sakamoto (Masshi) and Masami Kikuchi (Hiroshi)
 Masshi and Hiroshi are mischievous sprites from the Land of Magic. They cause great destruction and are eventually punished by becoming Hime-chan's assistants. They provide Hime-chan new powers through new accessories other than the ribbon. Hiroshi is a fox-like sprite who has the ability to fly. Masshi does not have a fox-like tail, but looks similar and is lifted from place to place by his partner.

Incantations
To perform magic several different incantations are recited. When Hime-chan first receives the ribbon she is told to recite "Parallel, Parallel, (person's name) ni nare". After the excitement of transformation Hime-chan dismisses Erika's important instruction to recite this incantation saying Parallel backwards, "Rurerapa rurerapa motono sugatani nare." which causes her to almost be caught as the Principal of the school forever. Pokota had to remind her of the correct way of pronouncing Rurerapa to avoid this.

Episode list

Music

Reception
Jennifer B from THEM Anime reviews stated that Hime-chan's Ribbon is "a fun, cute series that's worth watching if you like magical girl shows" and "Hime-chan herself is a likable character". Andrew Sheldon from Anime-Meta Review felt that "The writing is well done, has a great sense of character and can be touching". Kelly Mayback from the Anime Cafe: A Parent's Guide to Anime described it as "an EXCELLENT series to use when exploring Japanese culture".

Remake
In 2009 the series was remade, with manga creator Shiho Komiyuno penning the series. Hime-chan no Ribon Colorful premiered in the October 2009 issue of Ribon, the same magazine that the original series ran in. Differences between the two series included the setting being moved to modern day as well as the character of Pokota being replaced by a shape changing Princess Erika.

References

External links
Fansites Webring

1990 manga
1992 anime television series debuts
1992 Japanese television series debuts
1993 Japanese television series endings
1993 musicals
2009 manga
TV Tokyo original programming
Shueisha franchises
Magical girl anime and manga
Gallop (studio)
Musicals based on anime and manga
Fiction about size change